The Mercyhurst Lakers women's hockey team represented Mercyhurst College in the 2012–13 NCAA Division I women's ice hockey season. The Lakers were coached by Michael Sisti and advanced to the NCAA Frozen Four, before being defeated by Boston University 4-1 in the National Semifinal.

Offseason

Junior Forward Christine Bestland and Sophomore Forward Shelby Bram were invited to the Team Canada U22 Development selection camp. Bram was ultimately chosen to the team, and faced off against the US U22 Women, which included Mercyhurst graduate Kelley Steadman. Team USA swept the three game series.

Recruiting

Transfers

Roster

2012–13 Lakers

Schedule

|-
!colspan=12 style=""| Regular Season

|-
!colspan=12 style=""| CHA Tournament

|-
!colspan=12 style=""| NCAA Tournament

Awards and honors

Junior Forward Christine Bestland was unanimously chosen as the CHA Conference Player of the Year.
Stephanie Ciampa was named CHA Goaltender of the Year.
Bestland, Forward Shelby Bram and Defender Vaila Higson were named to the All-Conference First Team.
Defender Molly Byrne was named to the Second Team.
Forwards Emily Janiga and Jenna Dingeldein, as well as Defender Lauren Kilroy were named to the All-Rookie Team.
Christine Bestland was named to the All-USCHO Third Team. The USCHO honors the best college players in the nation.

References

Mercyhurst Lakers women's ice hockey seasons
Mercyhurst
Mercy
Mercy